Leap of Faith is the seventh studio album by American singer-songwriter Kenny Loggins.  The album was released on September 10, 1991 by Columbia Records. It was the first album Loggins released after a divorce, and is notably longer than his previous solo albums.  Singles from the album included "The Real Thing," "If You Believe," "Now or Never," and "Conviction of the Heart," the latter of which was later dubbed "the unofficial anthem of the environmental movement" by Vice President Al Gore. "I Would Do Anything" features Sheryl Crow who can also be heard in the title song along with Smokey Robinson.

Track listing
 "Will of the Wind" (Loggins, Will Ackerman) – 2:00
 "Leap of Faith" (Loggins, Guy Thomas) – 7:23
 "The Real Thing" (Loggins, David Foster) – 5:39
 "Conviction of the Heart" (Loggins, Guy Thomas) – 6:52
 "If You Believe" (Loggins, Steve Wood) – 6:32
 "I Would Do Anything" – Duet with Sheryl Crow (Loggins, David Foster) – 6:34
 "Sweet Reunion" (Loggins, Steve Wood) – 5:46
 "Now or Never" (Loggins, Guy Thomas) – 5:45
 "My Father's House" (Loggins, Will Ackerman) – 5:27
 "Cody's Song" (Loggins) – 4:39
 "Will of the Wind (Reprise)" (Loggins, Will Ackerman) – 1:14
 "Too Early for the Sun" (Loggins, John Barnes) – 8:06

Personnel
 Kenny Loggins – lead vocals, acoustic guitar (4), a cappella choir (7), arrangements (8, 12), acoustic classical guitar (10)
 Will Ackerman – acoustic guitar (1, 9)
 Hiram Bullock – acoustic guitar (2), voice solo (2)
 James Harrah – electric guitar (2)
 Guy Thomas – acoustic guitar (2, 10), electric guitar (4), guitar solo (6), classical guitar (8)
 Paul Jackson Jr. – acoustic guitar (3), electric guitar (5, 6, 7), classical guitar (7)
 Dean Parks – acoustic guitar (3, 12), classical guitar (6)
 David Lindley – electric slide guitar (4, 5)
 Ottmar Liebert – classical guitar fade (6)
 Tim Pierce – electric guitar (8)
 Steve Wood – synthesizers (2, 3, 7), keyboards (4), organ (5)
 David Foster – acoustic piano (3)
 Richard Tee – acoustic piano (5)
 John Barnes – vocal arrangements (5), Synclavier (6, 8, 12), acoustic piano (7), strings (7), arrangements (8, 12), synthesizers (12)
 Greg Phillinganes – keyboards (6), synth voices (7)
 Randy Jackson – bass guitar (2)
 Freddie Washington – fretless bass (3), bass guitar (4, 5, 7)
 Nathan East – upright bass (6)
 Keith Jones – fretless bass (8)
 Mike Baird – drums (3), field snare (4)
 Tris Imboden – drums (4)
 Herman Matthews – drums (5), voice drums (7)
 John Robinson – drums (5)
 Ricky Lawson – cymbal (6), tom tom (6)
 Munyungo Jackson – percussion (2, 4, 5, 7, 12), tambura (5)
 Bill Summers – percussion (2, 4, 5, 7), tambura (5)
 Paulinho da Costa – percussion (6)
 Luis Conte – percussion (8)
 Kazu Matsui – shakuhachi (6, 11)
 Marc Russo – sax solo (7), saxophone (10)
 Enrique Cruz – pan flute (9)
 Everette Harp – alto saxophone (12)
 Steve Dubin – drum arrangement (3)
 Paul Buckmaster – string arrangements (3, 10, 12)
 Michael Marksman – string contractor (10)
 Angeles String Quartet – strings (10)
 Kate Price – backing vocals (1, 4, 8, 9)
 Sheryl Crow – backing vocals (2, 5), intro choir (5), duet vocal (6)
 Smokey Robinson – cameo vocal (2)
 Terry Nelson – backing vocals (4)
 Adult Choir – choir (4)
 Arnold McCuller – choir director (4)
  Colors of Love – children's choir (4, 5)
 Nyna Shannon Anderson – children's choir director (4, 5)
 Siedah Garrett – intro choir (5), backing vocals (5)
 Ruth Pointer – intro choir (5), backing vocals (5)
 Katrina Adams – vocal soloist (5)
 Laurie Rubin – vocal soloist (5)
 Thomas Patterson –vocal soloist (5)
 Amy Holland – backing vocals (8)
 Maureen McDonald Ferguson – backing vocals (8)
 Michael McDonald – backing vocals (8)
 The McDonald Family Choir – choir (8)
 Mavis Staples – cameo vocal (12)
 Morgan Ames – backing vocals (12)
 Darlene Koldenhoven – backing vocals (12)
 Myrna Matthews – backing vocals (12)
 Carmen Twillie – backing vocals (12)

Production
 Producers – David Kershenbaum (Tracks 1, 2, 9 & 11); Kenny Loggins and Terry Nelson (Tracks 3–8, 10 & 12).
 Engineer – Terry Nelson
 Keyboard Programming - Dave Squatty Barrera
 Assistant Engineers – Neal Avron, Tracy Chisholm, Juan Garza, Steve Harrison, Steve Holroyd, Anders Johansson, Leslie Jones, Julie Last, Scott Lovelis, Pat McDougal, Jack Roubin, David Russell, Andrew Scheps and John Whynot.
 Recorded at Westlake Audio, Ocean Way Recording and Studio 55 (Los Angeles, CA); The Enterprise and Red Zone Studios (Burbank, CA); Capitol Studios, Sunset Sound and Soundcastle (Hollywood, CA); Gateway Studios (Carpinteria, CA); Lahaina Sound Recording (Lahaina, Maui).
 Mixed by Brian Malouf at The Enterprise.
 Mastered by Doug Sax at The Mastering Lab (Hollywood, CA).
 Art Direction – Nancy Lane
 Design – Tracy Veal
 Photography – Annie Elliott Cutting
 Management – Shep Gordon and Denzyl Feigelson at Alive Enterprises.

Notes 

1991 albums
Kenny Loggins albums
Columbia Records albums
Albums arranged by Paul Buckmaster
Albums produced by David Kershenbaum